The First United Methodist Church of Umatilla  (listed as the Methodist Episcopal Church, South, at Umatilla) is an historic Methodist church in Umatilla, Florida, in the United States. It is located at 100 West Guerrant Street. On January 27, 2000, it was added to the National Register of Historic Places.

It is a one-story brick with an irregular plan and a complex cross-gable roof, which was built in 1922.  It has "two entry towers, pointed windows with stained glass, and a pedimented main facade with two classical columns", and it incorporated the frame shell of an 1886 predecessor building.

References

External links
 First United Methodist Church of Umatilla website
 Florida's Office of Cultural and Historical Programs
 Lake County listings
 First United Methodist Church

United Methodist churches in Florida
National Register of Historic Places in Lake County, Florida
Churches on the National Register of Historic Places in Florida
Churches in Lake County, Florida
Churches completed in 1922
1922 establishments in Florida